Buyongsan may refer to:
 Buyongsan (Chuncheon/Hwacheon) in the city of Chuncheon and the county of Hwacheon, Gangwon-do, South Korea. 882 metres.
 Buyongsan (Pyeongchang) in the county of Pyeongchang, Gangwon-do. 1232 metres.
 Buyongsan (Jangheung) in the county of Jangheung, Jeollanam-do. 609 metres.
 Buyongsan (Yeosu) in the city of Yeosu, Jeollanam-do. 359 metres.